The Tecucel is a right tributary of the river Bârlad in Romania. It discharges into the Bârlad in the city Tecuci.

References

Rivers of Romania
Rivers of Galați County